Lraber Hasarakakan Gitutyunneri ( "Bulletin/Review of Social Sciences") is a triannual peer-reviewed academic journal published by the Armenian Academy of Sciences covering Armenian studies.

The journal's archives have undergone digitalization.

See also 
 Patma-Banasirakan Handes
 Bazmavep
 Haigazian Armenological Review
 Handes Amsorya
 Revue des Études Arméniennes

References

External links 
 

History journals
Armenian studies journals
Publications established in 1958
Multilingual journals
Armenian-language journals
English-language journals
Russian-language journals